XHGPE-FM is a talk station on 96.1 FM in Guadalupe, Zacatecas. It is known as La Voz and owned by Rate Cultural y Educativa de México, A.C., for the ImagenZac group which includes the Imagen de Zacatecas newspaper.

History
XHGPE-FM was approved by the IFT on December 14, 2016. Testing began on April 11, 2019, but full-time regular programming did not commence until August 28. The station broadcasts music, talk shows, and news provided by the newspaper's reporters.

References

Radio stations in Zacatecas
2019 establishments in Mexico
Radio stations established in 2019